Jadeveon Davarus Clowney (born February 14, 1993) is an American football defensive end who is a free agent. He played college football at South Carolina, where he won the Ted Hendricks Award, and was selected first overall by the Houston Texans in the 2014 NFL Draft. Clowney was a member of the Texans for five seasons, earning three consecutive Pro Bowl selections during his final years with the team. Following his departure from Houston, he played with the Seattle Seahawks and Tennessee Titans before joining the Browns in 2021.

High school career

Clowney was born February 14, 1993, in Rock Hill, South Carolina. He  attended South Pointe High School, where he played for the Stallions high school football team. Already 6’ 3” and 200 lbs as a freshman in 2007, he played running back and defensive end for the school's junior varsity team. In his sophomore year he joined rising seniors Stephon Gilmore and DeVonte Holloman (both four-star recruits) on a South Pointe varsity coming off a 9–4 season. By spring practice, Clowney became a permanent fixture at defensive end. "We knew we had something special. He was 13 years old in that big athletic body. He was wreaking havoc on our offense that spring and fall," said Bobby Carroll, his coach at South Pointe. South Pointe went 15–0 for the season, including a 35–14 win over town-rival Northwestern High at Memorial Stadium for the 2008 South Carolina AAAA Division II title and a No. 3 spot in the annual MaxPreps high school ranking. Despite playing nearly the entire season with a bone spur in his foot, Clowney finished with 17 sacks. He opted to have surgery on the foot in January 2009.

South Pointe had 31 seniors graduate after the 2008 season, including Gilmore and Holloman. Still, Clowney helped the team to a 10–4 record for the season, and a state semifinal berth, where the Stallions lost to Northwestern. Clowney finished the season with 144 tackles and 23 sacks. In his senior season Clowney tallied 162 tackles, 29.5 sacks, 29 tackles for loss, 11 forced fumbles, and six fumble recoveries, and scored five touchdowns on defense while helping lead his team to a 13–2 record. South Pointe made the state finals for the second time in three years, but lost 23–27 to Myrtle Beach at USC's Williams-Brice Stadium. Still, Clowney was named South Carolina's 2010 Mr. Football. South Pointe was 38–6 during his three varsity seasons.

Immediately following his senior season Clowney went to Spartanburg for the Shrine Bowl of the Carolinas, where he registered 5 tackles (2 solo, 3 assists), 3 sacks for a loss of 15 yards, 2 tackles for a loss of 17 yards, and 2 quarterback hurries. Clowney was lined up against the North Carolina left tackle on every snap he played and drew five holding calls. After the Shrine Bowl, Clowney headed to Orlando, Florida, for a week of Under Armour All-America Game practices and then the all-star game itself. He was the leading tackler for the Red with seven and had 1.5 sacks. Recruiting analysts were particularly interested in his matchup with Cyrus Kouandjio.

Afterwards, Clowney headed to New York City, for a photo shoot for an ESPN the Magazine feature story that appeared in the journal's February 2011 issue.

Recruiting
During and throughout the entirety of his middle school and high school career, Clowney was often regarded as the best player in his class. ESPN described him as "a special talent who could have vied for the top spot in several previous classes". Both major recruiting services, Rivals.com and Scout.com, as well as ESPNU, considered Clowney not only a five-star recruit, but also the No. 1 overall prospect of the 2011 class, basically throughout his senior year. Unsurprisingly, he received scholarship offers from nearly every perennial BCS powerhouse. However, Clowney left his decision open until after National Signing Day of 2011.

In a live broadcast on ESPN on his eighteenth birthday—February 14, 2011—Clowney announced his commitment to South Carolina, selecting the Gamecocks over Clemson, Alabama, Louisiana State, and Florida State. He was the third-straight South Carolina "Mr. Football" to sign with the Gamecocks, following in the footsteps of his South Pointe teammate Gilmore, and Duncan Byrnes' Marcus Lattimore. "I wanted to play in the SEC. It was easy," Clowney said. "I knew a week ago. I just tried not to tell anybody." Just days earlier, a story in the New York Times questioned Clowney's academic eligibility, but Clowney told reporters he "had no concerns and would be fine".

Track
Clowney was also on the school's track & field team, where he competed as a sprinter, shot putter and discus thrower. He took ninth in the 100 meters at the 2011 York County Championships, with a career-best time of 11.43 seconds. He recorded a personal-best throw of 14.82 meters in the shot put at the 2011 State Championships, and also ran the fourth leg on the 4 × 100 meter relay squad, helping them earn a third-place finish at 42.86 seconds.

College career
Clowney attended the University of South Carolina where he played on the Gamecocks football team under head coach Steve Spurrier from 2011 through 2013.

2011 season

As a true freshman at South Carolina Clowney played in all 12 games of the season. He started the season opener against East Carolina, becoming the first freshman to start on the defensive line since Travian Robertson in 2007. In his debut, Clowney had seven tackles, a pass breakup, and a quarterback hurry. A week later in the SEC season opener against Georgia, Clowney recorded his first career quarterback sack in the second quarter, tackling Bulldogs quarterback Aaron Murray for a 7-yard loss. With just over three minutes remaining and the Gamecocks clinging to a 38–35 lead, Clowney sacked Murray at the 10-yard line, causing him to fumble. Fellow defensive lineman Melvin Ingram recovered the football and returned it for a touchdown to put South Carolina up by 10. Against Vanderbilt, Clowney forced two fumbles, including one that again was recovered by Ingram and returned for a touchdown. In mid-October against Mississippi State, Clowney recorded up a sack, forced fumble, and two quarterback hurries. In South Carolina's 30–13 win over Nebraska in the Capital One Bowl, Clowney recorded four tackles and two sacks of quarterback Taylor Martinez.

For the season Clowney was credited with 36 tackles, including 12 for a loss of yardage. He ranked eighth in the SEC with 8.0 sacks, the only freshman in the top 10, and logged five forced fumbles. He earned SEC Freshman of the Year and All-SEC 2nd Team honors from the league's coaches, and was also named to multiple Freshman All-American 1st Team lists, including The Sporting News, FWAA, Rivals.com, and CBSSports.com.

2012 season

In his sophomore season Clowney emerged as the best defensive player in college football. While helping lead South Carolina to an 11–2 (6–2 SEC) record, he set the school single-season record for sacks (13.0) and tackles for loss (23.5). He also amassed 54 tackles (40 solo) and 3 forced fumbles. Against UAB, Clowney was credited with seven tackles with 3.5 tackles for loss and 2.0 sacks, for which he was named the SEC Defensive Lineman of the Week. In the 27–17 win over Clemson, he sacked Tigers quarterback Tajh Boyd for a single-game school record 4.5 times, earning SEC Defensive Player and Defensive Lineman of the Week honors again. It was also a Clemson Memorial Stadium record, topping the previous mark jointly held by Notre Dame's Ross Browner (1977) and Virginia Tech's Bruce Smith (1984), both College Football Hall of Famers. Along with being a Unanimous All-American, Clowney won the Ted Hendricks Award as the nation's best defensive end.  Additionally, he was a finalist for the Chuck Bednarik Award, the Bronko Nagurski Trophy, the Lombardi Award, and finished 6th overall in the 2012 Heisman Trophy voting. Following Clowney's incredible sophomore season, he was voted by the fans as the 2012 AT&T All-America Player of the Year on January 7.

In the Outback Bowl on January 1, 2013, Clowney helped the Gamecocks to a 33–28 victory over the Michigan Wolverines. He gained instant fame for a hit on Michigan running back Vincent Smith that came with eight minutes left in the fourth quarter, after a controversial first down call in Michigan's favor.  The hit forced a fumble that Clowney himself recovered, which then set up a touchdown on the next play. On July 17, 2013, Clowney won the 2013 ESPY Award for best play for that hit.

2013 season

Following much off-season hype, Clowney began his junior season as a frontrunner for the Heisman Trophy. In the season-opener against North Carolina, weakened by gastroenteritis, Clowney appeared "tired" and only registered three tackles. After a slow start to the season, while being plagued by minor injuries, Clowney's Heisman chances began to fade. His decision to sit out the Kentucky game with a muscle strain near his rib area caused media controversy. In a much anticipated rematch with Tennessee offensive tackle Antonio Richardson at Neyland Stadium, Clowney recorded a season-high five tackles, including four solo, in an overall performance that was widely praised. He sat out another game, against Coastal Carolina, ailing with bone spurs in his right foot on November 23.

Clowney finished his junior season with 35 tackles, 10.5 for a loss of yardage, and three quarterback sacks—considerably lower in each category compared to his sophomore year. Nonetheless, he was again a first-team All-Southeastern Conference (SEC) selection. However, after receiving unanimous All-American honors in 2012, Clowney was only selected to one 2013 All-America team—by the American Football Coaches Association.

After South Carolina's 34–24 win over Wisconsin in the 2014 Capital One Bowl, in which Clowney had five tackles including one for a loss, he announced that he was going to forgo his senior year and enter the NFL Draft.

College statistics

Professional career

2014 NFL Draft
As early as January 2013, Clowney was projected as a top-three selection in the 2014 NFL Draft. "Clowney's a rare talent, basically to the defensive end spot what Andrew Luck and RG3 were to the quarterback position," said ESPN analyst Mel Kiper, Jr. "These type of prospects just don't come along very often." NFL media analyst Bucky Brooks described Clowney as a "meaner, nastier version of Julius Peppers." Clowney's injuries, as well as his mediocre performance early in his junior season reportedly did not scare NFL executives. Late September 2013 mock drafts still ranked Clowney among the top-two picks. After the college season concluded, Clowney was still projected No. 1 by Sports Illustrated. In a postgame interview after the Capital One Bowl, Clowney confirmed he was going to enter the 2014 NFL Draft.

At the NFL Combine in February 2014, Clowney excelled in the 40-yard dash, posting an official time of 4.53 seconds, the fastest among defensive linemen, which caused USA Today calling him "by far the most freakish physical specimen in this draft".

Houston Texans

2014 season
Clowney was selected as the first overall pick by the Houston Texans in the 2014 NFL Draft.	
Clowney joined David Carr and Mario Williams as the third player selected first overall by the Texans. He was also the first defensive player selected first overall by any team since Williams in 2006, as well as the first player in history to be the unanimous highest recruit and be selected first overall in the NFL . On June 6, 2014, Clowney signed a four-year deal worth $22.272 million that featured a $14.518 million signing bonus.

Clowney made his professional debut on August 9, 2014, during the first preseason game against the Arizona Cardinals, where he made a tackle for a loss of 5 yards. During the second preseason game against the Atlanta Falcons, Clowney recorded his first professional sack where he sacked Matt Ryan. Before the third preseason game against the Denver Broncos, Clowney began to experience concussion-like symptoms after a helmet-to-helmet collision with tight end Jacob Tamme during dual practice and did not play for the rest of the preseason.

Clowney made his regular season debut on September 7 against the Washington Redskins, making one tackle for a loss but left the game in the second quarter due to a knee injury. It was later revealed that Clowney had a torn meniscus. He underwent surgery to repair the meniscus on September 8, and recovery time required 4 to 6 weeks. Clowney was placed on injured reserve to undergo further surgery on his knee on December 4, ending his rookie season with seven tackles in four games. It was eventually revealed that Clowney had microfracture surgery.

2015 season
After a spate of injuries the previous year, Clowney did not play in the preseason, but returned on September 13, 2015, against the Kansas City Chiefs, making four tackles, of which one was for loss, in the 20-27 defeat. Clowney recorded his first regular season NFL sack in a game against the Miami Dolphins on October 25, 2015. In 13 games (9 starts), he had 40 tackles, 4.5 sacks, and six passes defended.

2016 season
Clowney was named to his first Pro Bowl and awarded First-team All-Pro in 2016. He was also named to The Sporting News All-Pro team for recording 6 sacks, 16 tackles for a loss, 52 total tackles, 1 forced fumble, and 2 passes defensed in 14 starts. On January 7, 2017, in the Wild Card Round against the Oakland Raiders, he recorded his first NFL interception against Connor Cook, in a 27-14 win. He was ranked 49th by his fellow players on the NFL Top 100 Players of 2017.

2017 season
On April 14, 2017, the Texans picked up the fifth-year option on Clowney's contract.

In Week 2, on Thursday Night Football, cornerback Kareem Jackson caused a fumble on rookie Cincinnati Bengals wide receiver John Ross, which Clowney recovered and took back for 49 yards to set up the Texans offense on a field goal scoring drive. Clowney's play proved important as points were at a premium in the 13–9 victory over the Cincinnati Bengals. On September 24, against the New England Patriots. Clowney scored his first NFL touchdown off of a fumble by Tom Brady, in a 36-33 loss. On December 19, 2017, Clowney was named to his second Pro Bowl, but he could not participate due to his knee surgery. He was ranked #32 by his fellow players on the NFL Top 100 Players of 2018.

2018 season

In Week 4, Clowney recorded four tackles, two sacks, and recovered a fumble and returned it for a touchdown in a 37-34 win over the Indianapolis Colts, earning him AFC Defensive Player of the Week. On December 23, Clowney illegally sacked Philadelphia Eagles quarterback Nick Foles. He was fined $40,110 for the incident. Overall, in the 2018 season, he finished with nine sacks, 47 total tackles, one pass defensed, one forced fumble, and one fumble recovery for a touchdown.

On March 4, 2019, the Texans placed the franchise tag on Clowney. He was ranked 63rd by his fellow players on the NFL Top 100 Players of 2019.

Seattle Seahawks
On August 31, 2019, the Texans traded Clowney to the Seattle Seahawks in exchange for Jacob Martin, Barkevious Mingo, and a third-round pick in the 2020 NFL Draft.
Clowney made his debut with the Seahawks in week 1 against the Cincinnati Bengals.  Clowney sacked Andy Dalton once in the 21–20 win. His first-ever regular season interception took place in Arizona on September 29, 2019, off a screen pass from rookie quarterback Kyler Murray;  he returned it to the end zone for a touchdown in Seattle's 27–10 win. On October 3, Clowney forced a fumble from running back Todd Gurley and recovered it as the Seahawks went on to win 30–29 against the Rams on Thursday Night Football.
In week 8 against the Atlanta Falcons, Clowney recorded a strip sack on Matt Ryan which was recovered by teammate Ziggy Ansah in the 27–20 win.
In week 10 against the San Francisco 49ers on Monday Night Football, Clowney recorded a strip sack on Jimmy Garoppolo which was recovered by teammate Poona Ford and recovered a fumble forced by teammate Jarran Reed on Garoppolo for a 10 yard touchdown in the 27–24 overtime win.
He was named the NFC Defensive Player of the Week for his performance.

In the NFC Wild Card Round against the Philadelphia Eagles, Clowney recorded five tackles and sacked Josh McCown once in the 17–9 win. During the first quarter, Clowney made a helmet-to-helmet hit on Eagles' starting quarterback Carson Wentz which knocked him out of the game. Afterwards, the NFL announced it would not fine Clowney for the hit.
On January 17, 2020, Clowney was named one of the 2020 Pro Bowl alternates. He was ranked 41st by his fellow players on the NFL Top 100 Players of 2020.

Tennessee Titans
On September 8, 2020, Clowney signed a one-year deal worth $12 million with the Tennessee Titans. He was placed on injured reserve on November 21, 2020, with a knee injury.

Cleveland Browns

2021 season

On April 14, 2021, Clowney signed a one-year contract with the Cleveland Browns. Clowney had a productive first season in Cleveland, appearing in 14 games, posting 37 tackles, nine sacks (his most since 2018), and two forced fumbles, while being named a 2022 Pro Bowl alternate.

2022 season
On May 22, 2022, Clowney re-signed with the Browns on a one-year deal worth up to $11 million.

On January 6, 2023, Clowney was sent home by the Browns after making critical comments about his usage and likelihood to return to Cleveland in 2023. He was inactive for the season finale.

On March 15, 2023, Clowney was released by the Browns.

NFL career statistics

Regular season

Postseason

Personal life
Clowney's mother, Josenna Clowney, has been a processing technician at the Frito-Lay plant in Charlotte, North Carolina, since 1994. His father, David Morgan, was released from prison in 2006 after serving nearly 12 years for robbing a Rock Hill check-cashing business in 1995. With his father incarcerated for much of his childhood, Clowney was raised by his mother and his maternal grandparents, John and Josephine Clowney, as well as his mother's longtime boyfriend, Christopher Jones. His cousin, Demon Clowney, currently plays linebacker for the Ole Miss Rebels.

References

External links

Cleveland Browns bio
South Carolina Gamecocks bio

1993 births
Living people
People from Rock Hill, South Carolina
African-American players of American football
Players of American football from South Carolina
American football defensive ends
American football outside linebackers
South Carolina Gamecocks football players
All-American college football players
Under Armour All-American football players
National Football League first-overall draft picks
Houston Texans players
Seattle Seahawks players
Tennessee Titans players
Cleveland Browns players
American Conference Pro Bowl players
21st-century African-American sportspeople
Ed Block Courage Award recipients